Nicolas Durand, sieur de Villegaignon, also Villegagnon (1510 – 9 January 1571) was a Commander of the Knights of Malta, and later a French naval officer (vice-admiral of Brittany) who attempted to help the Huguenots in France escape persecution.

A notable public figure in his time, Villegaignon was a mixture of soldier, scientist, explorer, adventurer and entrepreneur. He fought pirates in the Mediterranean and participated in several wars.

Villegagnon was born in Provins, Seine et Marne, France, a nephew of Philippe Villiers de L'Isle-Adam, Grand Master of the Order of Malta. He was received as a Knight of the Order in 1521.

Ottoman campaigns in the Mediterranean and in Scotland
Nicolas de Villegagnon fought in numerous campaigns against the Ottoman Empire. Although the French usually refrained from participating in actions against the Ottomans, due to the Franco-Ottoman alliance, Villegagnon's first allegiance was with the Order of Malta, which generally supported the Habsburgs and fought the Ottomans. Villegagnon participated in the ill-fated expedition against Algiers in 1541. He also fought against the Ottomans in Hungary in 1542 following the Siege of Buda (1541) until 1546.

In 1548, he commanded the French naval fleet that took Mary, Queen of Scots, then five years old, to France, since she was promised to marry the Dauphin of France. This was a daring operation, covertly sailing galleys around Scotland, while the English fleet was expecting an attack from the other direction. Back in Scotland in March 1549, in February he helped capture Ferniehirst Castle from the English. The commanders then discussed their next move. Nicolas insisted they should halt and build a fortification at Roxburgh and decided the best position. The Scottish high command held a vote which was inconclusive, but finally, after the intervention of the French ambassador Henri Cleutin, Nicolas's plan was adopted.

Villegagnon helped repel the Ottomans at Malta in 1551 before they went on to lead the Invasion of Gozo (1551).
He was then present at the Siege of Tripoli (1551) against the Ottoman Empire, and wrote an account about it in 1553. Villegagnon illustrated himself by courageously defending Gaspard de Vallier, the vanquished Commander of Tripoli, who was being heavily criticized by the Grand Master d'Homedes who wished to assign all the blame for the defeat on him. Nicolas de Villegagnon staunchly defended him and exposed the duplicity of d'Homedes.

France Antarctique

Villegaignon became an important historical figure in the attempt for king Henry II to build a "France Antarctique", by invading present-day Rio de Janeiro, Brazil in 1555 with a fleet of two ships and 600 soldiers and colonists, mainly French Huguenots and Swiss Calvinists who sought to escape Catholic persecution in Europe. A disagreement over Eucharistic theology soon caused Villegagnon and the Calvinists to quarrel. Villegagnon eventually expelled those who held to Calvin's view of the Eucharist from his fortified island.

Villegagnon's initial plan was to help the Huguenots establish a colony in the New World. He wanted also to secure a permanent base in Brazil in order to exploit brazil wood, then a very valuable source of red dye and hardwood for construction (which gave the name to what was to become Brazil), and to explore precious metals and stones, which the Europeans believed to exist in abundance in the land.

After a number of battles against the Portuguese, the French colonists were defeated by Estácio de Sá, a nephew of the third Portuguese Governor-General of Brazil, Mem de Sá, on 15–16 March 1558.

Return to France
Villegaignon had already returned to France, in 1559, disgusted with the infighting between Catholics and Protestants in the small colony. He had left the colony under the command of his nephew Bois-le-Comte, endeavouring to obtain more funds and ships for the colony. The internal fight against the Calvinists however made colonial adventures less of a priority for the Crown. After the colony fell to the Portuguese, Villegagnon finally agreed to give up his claims to France Antarctique after receiving 30,000 écus from the Portuguese Crown.

Fight against the Protestants
In 1560, Villegagnon challenged Calvin to a theological debate on the eucharist, which the latter declined. He became actively involved against the Protestants, and participated in the repression of the Amboise conspiracy.

In 1561, Pierre Richier published a pamphlet against Villegagnon's actions in Brazil, entitled "Réfutation des folles resveries, excecrable blasphèmes, erreurs et mensonges de Nicolas Durand, qui se nomme Villagagnon" [Refutation of the foolish imaginations, terrible blasphemies, errors and lies of Nicolas Durand, named Villagagnon].

New attempts were made to create a Huguenot colony in the New World, again at the instigation of Coligny, this time in French Florida from 1562 to 1565, under Jean Ribault and René de Laudonnière.

From 1568, Villegagnon became the representative of the Order of Malta at the French Court. The next year, in 1569, he published in Paris a new controversy about the eucharist, entitled "De Consecratione, mystico sacrificio et duplici Christi oblatione".

Villegagnon became Commander of the Order of Malta Commandery in Beauvais, where he died on 9 January 1571, aged about 60.

The Catholic André Thévet, who had accompanied him on the first trip to Brazil, published in 1572 a description of the Brazil adventure and an attack on the Protestants, in his "Cosmographie Universelle". The Protestant Jean Léry would respond to it in 1578 with his "Histoire d'un voyage faict en la terre du Brésil".

Legacy

In his book, Brazil, A Land of the Future, Austrian writer Stefan Zweig describes the colorful character of Villegaignon:

On 2012 French-Portuguese-Brazilian TV series Rouge Brésil/Vermelho Brasil (Red Brazil), on the history of France Antarctique, Villegaignon (spelled Villegagnon) is portrayed by Swedish actor Stellan Skarsgård.

A street in the Maltese city of Mdina is named after Villegaignon.

He appears as an important supporting character in The Course of Fortune by Tony Rothman (J. Boylston, 2015), a novel that concerns the events leading to the Great Siege of Malta, 1565.

He is a supporting character in Dorothy Dunnett's novel The Disorderly Knights, the third volume of her Lymond Chronicles series.

The knight is featured in Eight Pointed Cross by Marthese Fenech (BDL 2011), a historical novel, the first of a trilogy, now completed, that culminates in the Great Siege of Malta, 1565.

See also
 Jean de Cointac
 Villegagnon Island

Notes

Further reading
 Heulhard, A., Villegagnon, Roi d'Amérique: un Homme de Mer au XVIe Siécle, (1897)

1510 births
1571 deaths
People from Provins
French Navy admirals
1560s in Brazil
Knights of Malta
French exploration in the Age of Discovery
France Antarctique